The Aline-Cleo Independent School District is a school district based in Aline, Oklahoma United States. It contains a combined elementary/middle school and a high school.

See also
 List of school districts in Oklahoma

References

External links
 Aline-Cleo Overview
 Aline Cleo Public Schools

School districts in Oklahoma
Education in Alfalfa County, Oklahoma